LNER may refer to:

London and North Eastern Railway, a railway company in the United Kingdom from 1923 until 1947
London North Eastern Railway, a train operating company in the United Kingdom since 2018
 Liquid neutral earthing resistor, a type of Liquid resistor

See also
, including articles about LNER locomotives